Catherine Roseanne Dennis (born 25 March 1969) is a British singer, songwriter, record producer and actress. She was the vocalist for D Mob, which had the successful hit single "C'mon and Get My Love". After a successful international solo career, Dennis later achieved great success as a writer of pop songs, scoring eight UK number ones and winning six Ivor Novello Awards. Notably, she co-wrote "Can't Get You Out of My Head" by Kylie Minogue, Britney Spears' song "Toxic", and Katy Perry's hit "I Kissed a Girl". 

In 2004, Dennis was listed 66th in the Q Magazine list of the top 100 most influential people in music and in 2006, she won the UK music industry's Woman of the Year Award.

Early life

Educated at Taverham High School, as a teenager she was spotted recording Stevie Wonder-influenced demos at The Kitchen in Norwich with her father (himself an experienced musician and local restaurateur) on piano. At the time she was working for Norwich Union. In 1986, Simon Fuller signed Dennis when she was only 17 to his 19 Management company and to label Polydor, and this began a career-long association with the impresario, that has seen Dennis provide songs for many Fuller-related artists and projects.

Performing career
Dennis achieved her first success as a vocalist with D Mob, when their single "C'mon and Get My Love" (which was credited as "introducing" Dennis) reached No. 15 in the UK Singles Chart and No. 10 in the Billboard Hot 100 in 1989. It is regarded as an underground classic in the dance music field, and a second collaboration with D Mob, "That's the Way of the World", was also a hit. It was followed by Dennis's debut album, Move to This. She subsequently scored three solo hits, all of which reached the UK Top 20 and the US Top 10. She enjoyed considerable success in Japan in the early 1990s. The three solo hits were: "Just Another Dream" (UK No. 13, US No. 9, Australia No. 14), which featured D Mob on backing vocals; a cover of the Wish and Fonda Rae 1984 club hit "Touch Me (All Night Long)" (UK No. 5, US No. 2, Australia No. 16), which is probably her most remembered hit to date; and "Too Many Walls" (UK No. 17, US No. 8, Australia No. 57).

"Touch Me (All Night Long)" stayed at No. 2 on the Billboard Hot 100 for two weeks, and was kept out of the No. 1 spot by Hi-Five's "I Like The Way (The Kissing Game)" in the first week, and Mariah Carey's "I Don't Wanna Cry" in the second week. The song was a cover and lyrical reworking of a 1984 single by Wish featuring Fonda Rae, which had peaked at No. 70 on the US R&B chart that year. "Touch Me (All Night Long)" reached No. 1 on the US Hot Dance Club Play chart, and its follow-up, "Too Many Walls", which Dennis co-wrote with Anne Dudley of Art of Noise (who also co-wrote the ABC track "All of My Heart"), was a No. 1 Adult Contemporary hit in the United States. It was around this time Dennis agreed to join Club MTV's first tour, booked for six weeks. She dropped out on the third date, later publicly accusing one of Milli Vanilli's members (the tour's headline act) of sexual harassment. During this period, she recorded a song called "Find the Key to Your Life" with David Morales, for the soundtrack to the movie Teenage Mutant Ninja Turtles II: The Secret of the Ooze. Subsequent releases were only minor hits.

Dennis released her second album, Into the Skyline, in September 1992, written with a focus toward the US market. The album featured the singles "You Lied to Me", "Irresistible", "Moments of Love", "Falling", and "Why" – the latter was credited to D Mob with Dennis. The album got to No. 8 in the UK Albums Chart, whilst in the US Billboard Hot 100, "You Lied to Me" was a Top 40 hit - her final American Top 40 single as a performer - and "Irresistible" made the Adult Contemporary Top 10; however, the album descended the chart rapidly. Dennis experienced a brief peak of fame, making a cameo in Beverly Hills, 90210 singing the songs "Moments of Love" (a minor US Adult Contemporary chart hit), "Why" (in the episode, not to feature D Mob) and "Touch Me (All Night Long)". In Japan, the album was called Into the Skyline +1, and featured three extra tracks: "Nothing Moves Me", a previous B-side, and two tracks that were both released as singles, "It's My Style", and "Love's a Cradle". She also provided background vocals on PM Dawn's US Top 10 and UK Top 20 hit "Looking through Patient Eyes", released in 1993. In that same year, she sang a duet with  Lance Ellington on the soundtrack of Robin Hood: Men in Tights

Dennis began to record a third album, Inspiration. The title track was recorded with Todd Terry, along with another song "Is There Life After You". Only one song from the recording sessions was ever released, "S.O.S.", which can be found on the Beverly Hills 90210: The College Years soundtrack. She wrote her first song for another artist by writing a song for Dannii Minogue called "Love's on Every Corner".

In 1996, Dennis changed her musical style: away from the dance-pop sound of previous releases, to a more traditional singer-songwriter approach. The resulting album, Am I the Kinda Girl?, was more in keeping with the Britpop sound of bands such as Blur and performers such as Stephen Duffy, and featured collaborations with Guy Chambers of The Lemon Trees and Andy Partridge of XTC. Three singles from the album were released: "West End Pad" (UK No. 25), "Waterloo Sunset" - a cover of The Kinks' song (UK No. 11), and her last solo single, "When Your Dreams Turn to Dust" (UK No. 43).

In 2001, Kylie Minogue had a worldwide hit with the Dennis and Rob Davis penned song "Can't Get You Out of My Head". The following year Dennis won the Best Dance Recording Grammy for writing "Come into My World". She followed that up with Britney Spears's hit song "Toxic" which also won the Grammy for Best Dance Recording. Dennis had a string of hits with S Club 7; she wrote almost all their hit singles such as "Never Had a Dream Come True", and also worked on the singles for the spin-off group S Club Juniors which was a younger version of S Club 7. Dennis wrote hit songs for Céline Dion, Delta Goodrem, and for Hear’Say and Bardot. She also wrote the fastest selling debut single in UK history for recording artist Will Young, the winner of the British music competition reality show Pop Idol, and his runner-up Gareth Gates. Dennis wrote the theme song to the television series American Idol. She wrote several songs for former S Club 7 member Rachel Stevens including "Sweet Dreams My LA Ex", and also two songs for Phil Roy, one of which was on the soundtrack for the film As Good as It Gets starring Jack Nicholson and Helen Hunt.

According to news reports, Dennis was working on a new album under the name Sexcassettes, which she planned to release in 2008. She has collaborated with Mark Ronson on his album, The Business.

As of 2015, Dennis became a vocal affiliate with Galantis by first performing, uncredited, on their debut album Pharmacy on the tracks "Runaway (U & I)" and "Louder, Harder, Better". She later co-wrote their song "Love on Me" from their second album The Aviary and sang on five songs from their 2019 album Church.

In 2019, Dennis returned to performing. She celebrated her 30th anniversary in the music business with a performance at London's Mighty Hoopla Festival.

In 2020 and 2021, Dennis wrote for Now United and collaborated with composer Will Gregory on the soundtrack for the BBC/Discovery Channel docuseries, Serengeti.

Songwriting career
 
Dennis has written a number of award-winning songs and international hit singles. Her first success was with "Bumper to Bumper", the B-side to the Spice Girls' hit "Wannabe".

Dennis continued this success by co-writing the Pop Idol theme (re-used for numerous international remakes of the show, including American Idol), and writing for Idol contestants, including Kelly Clarkson, Will Young, Gareth Gates, and Clay Aiken. Clarkson's single "Before Your Love" (a double a-side with "A Moment Like This") was Dennis's first US No. 1. 

Dennis's "Can't Get You Out of My Head" (recorded by Kylie Minogue) spent four weeks at number one in Britain, while also rekindling interest in Minogue in America, where it hit no. 7 on the Billboard Hot 100. With over three million copies sold worldwide, "Can't Get You Out of My Head" became the second highest selling single in 2001.

Dennis also co-wrote the international hit "Toxic" by Britney Spears, which went to number one in the UK and worldwide.

Dennis's biggest success came in 2008 with Katy Perry's smash hit "I Kissed a Girl" co-written alongside Katy Perry, Max Martin and Dr Luke, which ranks among the best-selling digital singles in history.

Dennis co-wrote three tracks on the Galantis album Pharmacy, one of which, "Runaway (U & I)", reached No. 1 in the UK Dance Chart, No. 9 in the US Dance Chart, and was nominated for a Grammy Award. Most recently Dennis has written with KT Tunstall, Black honey and Sigala.

Personal life
Dennis dated Noel Fitzpatrick, and the relationship ended during the year that the Britney Spears song "Toxic", co-written by Dennis, was recorded. A 2019 article published in The Irish Times speculated that Fitzpatrick may be the subject of the song.

Awards and nominations

World Music Awards Music Awards

|-
| 1991
| Herself
| No. 1 New Pop Female Artist
| 
|}

Awards and nominations

Billboard Music Awards

|-
| 1991
| Herself
| No. 1 New Pop Female Artist
| 
|}

Brit Awards

!Ref.
|-
| 1992
| Herself
| British Female Solo Artist
| 
|

Grammy Awards

|-
| 2004
| "Come into My World"
| Best Dance Recording
| 
|-
| 2005
| "Toxic"
| Best Dance Recording
| 
|}

Ivor Novello Awards

|-
| 2001
| "Never Had a Dream Come True"
| Best Song Musically & Lyrically
| 
|-
| rowspan=4|2002
| rowspan=4|"Can't Get You Out of My Head"
| International Hit of the Year 
| 
|-
| Most Performed Work
| 
|-
| The Ivors Dance Award
| 
|-
| rowspan=2|Best Selling UK Single
| 
|-
| 2003
| "Anything is Possible"
| 
|-
| 2005
| "Toxic"
| Most Performed Work
| 
|-
| 2018
| Herself
| Outstanding Song Collection
|

Discography

 Move to This (1990)
 Into the Skyline (1992)
 Am I the Kinda Girl? (1996)
 The Irresistible Cathy Dennis (2000)

See also
List of number-one dance hits (United States)
List of artists who reached number one on the US dance chart

References

External links
 Official web site
 Cathy Dennis Artist Profile on EMI Music Publishing
 
 2010 interview in The Gentlewoman

1969 births
Living people
English dance musicians
English house musicians
English women singer-songwriters
English record producers
English actresses
Grammy Award winners
Ivor Novello Award winners
Actors from Norwich
Musicians from Norwich
20th-century British musicians
21st-century British musicians
English women pop singers
20th-century English women singers
20th-century English singers
21st-century women musicians
British women record producers
Polydor Records artists
EMI Records artists